Atol is a two-seat kit amphibious aircraft with a wood composite structure. It was to be built in ultralight and light-sport aircraft (LSA) versions. Atol aircraft were produced by the Finnish company Atol Avion.

In April 2017 it was announced that the aircraft would be built for the North American market by Atol USA of Brunswick Landing, Maine.

By 2022 the company website had been taken down and the domain was for sale.

Development 
The Atol was designed by Markku Koivurova and produced by Martekno Ky and later Atol Avion Ltd. The development of Atol began in the 1970s, inspired by the American Osprey II. The first versions of the design used the Ken Rand KR structure. Atol's predecessors were larger and their structure recalled the traditional structure of a wooden aircraft.

The first water taxi tests of the new LSA version, the Atol 650, were commenced in December 2014 on the Kemijoki River, Finland, on the Arctic Circle. This new version first flew on 9 April 2015.

The 650 model was intended to be built in Maine, United States, with European deliveries initially forecast for late in 2018 and US deliveries starting in 2019.

On 3 July 2018, the 650 LSA prototype, OH-XNA crashed and burnt, near Rovaniemi.

By November 2022 the company website had been taken down and the domain was for sale. It is likely all development on the aircraft has ended. The proposed American manufacturer, Atol USA, was administratively dissolved on 13 August 2021.

Specifications (ATOL 495 LSA)

Notes 
Bodin, Jan: Perpetual Product Development - a Study of Small Technology-Driven Firms 2000, p. 143-151, University of Umeå's print, Umeå Sweden, 2000. 
Joensuu, Elina: Design in Finland 30 Years 1991, p. 30, Hämee's bookprint Ltd, Häme Finland, 1991. ISSN 0418-7717

References

External links 
 Atol Avion Ltd
 Atol 450 at the Finnish Aviation Museum

Amphibious aircraft